The  is a Japanese railway line connecting Keisei-Takasago Station and Narita Airport Terminal 1 Station. The entire route from Keisei Ueno Station, including the Keisei Main Line as far as Keisei-Takasago, is branded .

The Keisei Electric Railway operates over the entire line, while other companies operate over certain sections of it, such as Hokuso Railway. The new line is used by Skyliner limited express services operating at up to 160 km/h using Keisei AE series EMUs.

Operations
Trains utilize the Keisei Electric Railway's Main Line between Keisei Ueno and Keisei-Takasago. Trains run at a maximum speed of 160 km/h, thus completing the run from Nippori to Narita Airport Terminal 2·3 in a minimum of 36 minutes, 15 minutes faster than the previous Skyliner route, which took 51 minutes. The reserved-seat Keisei Skyliner limited express fare for the route between Narita airport and either Nippori or Ueno stations is ¥2,400 and takes 36-41 min., but the Access Express commuter fast train costs ¥1,270 and takes about 60 min. Express trains also operate to Haneda Airport from Narita Airport via Keisei-Takasago and Aoto then via the Keisei Oshiage Line to Oshiage, and on the Toei Asakusa Line via Shimbashi to Sengakuji, the Keikyu Main Line and via Shinagawa to the Keikyu Airport Line. This makes it possible to connect the two airports in a minimum of around 90 minutes, compared to the previous minimum of 106 minutes. Many Express trains separate (or connect) at Aoto or Takasago station and continue to the Keikyu Haneda International Airport station (¥1,630, about 90-100 min.) or one can transfer at Shinagawa or Keikyū Kamata (on the way to Haneda) to stay on the Keikyu Main Line for Yokohama (¥1,630, about 101 min.).

There are also plans to build a spur from the Toei Asakusa Line to Tōkyō Station, opening a (potentially) faster route to the airport via the Keisei Oshiage Line.

Basic data
Total length: 
Service operators and track owners:

Station list
Trains stop at stations marked "●" and pass those marked "｜".

History

Service on this line commenced on July 17, 2010. The line involved the refurbishment of 32.3 km of existing track on the Hokusō Line, as well as the construction of 19.1 km of new dual track to Narita Airport, partly using disused rights-of-way originally planned for the cancelled Narita Shinkansen project. The total cost, according to the Narita Rapid Rail Access website, was estimated to be ¥126 billion, or about US$1.3 billion. From the timetable revision on February 26, 2022, Toei 5500 series trains began operating on the line on weekdays.

Future plans 
In October 2022, Keisei announced that certain Skyliner trains would begin serving Shin-Kamagaya Station with the intent of improving access to Kashiwa and Matsudo in Chiba Prefecture. The planned implementation date is scheduled for 26 November 2022.

References
This article incorporates material from the corresponding article in the Japanese Wikipedia.

External links
 New Skyliner 
 Narita Rapid Rail Access Co. Ltd. 

Railway lines in Japan
Railway lines in Chiba Prefecture
Railway lines in Tokyo
Airport rail links in Japan
Narita International Airport
Standard gauge railways in Japan
Railway lines opened in 2010
Railway lines in highway medians
2010 establishments in Japan